Richard A. Berthelsen (born September 14, 1944 in Racine, Wisconsin) is a former interim executive director of the NFL Players Association. Berthelsen assumed the role after the death of Gene Upshaw on August 21, 2008, and left the office on March 16, 2009, when DeMaurice Smith was named as Upshaw's successor. Before becoming interim executive director, Berthelsen had worked for the NFL Players Association since 1972 as a legal counsel and principal assistant.

External links
NFLPA press release about Berthelsen assuming role of Executive Director
Berthelsen's profile on SportsLaw.org

Living people
1944 births
Sportspeople from Racine, Wisconsin
Executive Directors of the National Football League Players Association
Trade unionists from Wisconsin